Anton Kim Ewald (born August 7, 1993) is a Swedish singer and dancer. He has participated in Melodifestivalen several times as both a background dancer and singer.

Career
Ewald began his career as a background dancer at Melodifestivalen. In Melodifestivalen 2009, he danced behind Velvet when she competed in the third semi-final in Leksand with "The Queen". In Melodifestivalen 2012 he was a dancer and choreographer behind Danny Saucedo in his song "Amazing". He also danced and choreographed Andreas Lundstedt number "Aldrig aldrig" ("Never Never") during the same year's competition.

Ewald participated in Melodifestivalen 2013, the selection process for picking the Swedish entry to the Eurovision Song Contest with the song "Begging" written by Fredrik Kempe, Anton Malmberg Hård af Segerstad. After his semi-final performance on 9 February 2013, he placed third and was given a chance to take part in the "Second chance" round that was held in Löfbergs Lila Arena in Karlstad to qualify for the national final. Ewald choreographed the appearance himself.

At the Second Chance round held on 2 March 2013, he qualified for the national final in Friends Arena on 9 March after a final duel with Behrang Miri and his song "Jalla Dansa Sawa". Ewald became one of just two acts from the Second Chance round to qualify for the final, the other qualifier being Robin Stjernberg with his song "You". In the final of Melodifestivalen 2013 on 9 March 2013, Ewald finished fourth. After Melodifestivalen he released two music singles, "Begging" and "Can't Hold Back", and two EPs, A and A-coustic.

Anton participated once again in Melodifestivalen 2014, performing the song "Natural" in the fourth and last semi-final on 22 February. He made it to the final where he came in tenth place.
In 2015 he published with the Italian producer D.j. Mirko B. the single "Higher" dance.

He participated in Melodifestivalen 2021 with the song "New Religion", when he qualified for the finale, scheduled for 13 March 2021 where he placed 11th.

Discography

Extended plays

Singles

References

External links

English-language singers from Sweden
Swedish-language singers
Swedish pop singers
1993 births
Living people
21st-century Swedish singers
21st-century Swedish male singers
Melodifestivalen contestants of 2021
Melodifestivalen contestants of 2014
Melodifestivalen contestants of 2013